Cartersville is an unincorporated community in Cumberland County, in the U.S. state of Virginia.

Cartersville formed around the James River and Kanawha Canal. An 1855 gazetteer described it as having "1 church, several stores, and about 50 dwellings."

A number of properties on the National Register of Historic Places are located in and around Cartersville; among these are the plantation house Ampthill, the Cartersville Bridge, Hamilton High School, and Morven, an historic home, as well as the Cartersville Historic District.

Climate
Climate is characterized by relatively high temperatures and evenly distributed precipitation throughout the year.  The Köppen Climate Classification subtype for this climate is "Cfa" (Humid Subtropical Climate).

External links

References

Unincorporated communities in Cumberland County, Virginia
Populated places on the James River (Virginia)